Bill Bullard Jr. (July 12, 1943 – December 18, 2020) was an American politician. He was a Republican member of both houses of the Michigan Legislature and local official in Oakland County.

Biography
Bullard earned his bachelor's degree from the University of Michigan and law degree from the Detroit College of Law. He served in elected office in Highland Township from 1978 through 1982, and was elected to the state House in 1982. In 1994, Bullard was elected to the state Senate in a special election in June.

After leaving the Legislature, Bullard was elected to the Oakland County Board of Commissioners, where he served four terms, including six years as chairman, before being selected to succeed Ruth Johnson as county clerk/register of deeds when Johnson was elected Michigan Secretary of State. Bullard was defeated for re-election to a full term in 2012 by Lisa Brown.

Bullard died from complications of cancer and COVID-19 at Huron Valley-Sinai Hospital on December 18, 2020, aged 77, during the COVID-19 pandemic in Michigan.

References

University of Michigan alumni
Michigan State University College of Law alumni
Republican Party members of the Michigan House of Representatives
Republican Party Michigan state senators
1943 births
2020 deaths
County commissioners in Michigan
People from Highland, Oakland County, Michigan
Politicians from Detroit
Lawyers from Detroit
20th-century American politicians
21st-century American politicians
Deaths from the COVID-19 pandemic in Michigan
Deaths from cancer in Michigan